Margery Cuyler is an American children's book author. She has written many picture books, including That's Good! That's Bad! and the rest of its series.

Cuyler grew up in Princeton, NJ. She graduated from Sarah Lawrence College in 1970. Besides writing her own books, she has worked as a children's book editor and in executive positions at Amazon.com, Marshall Cavendish, Golden Books Family Entertainment, Henry Holt and Company, and Holiday House. In 2011, she appeared on The Celebrity Apprentice television show, judging the contestants on their work creating a children's book.

Cuyler lives in Lawrenceville, New Jersey.

Bibliography

Picture Books
 Sir William and the Pumpkin Monster, Henry Holt, 1984
 Freckles and Willie: A Valentine's Day Story, Henry Holt, 1986
 Fat Santa, Henry Holt, 1987
 Freckles and Jane, Henry Holt, 1989
 Shadow's Baby, Clarion Books, 1989
 Daisy's Crazy Thanksgiving, Henry Holt, 1990
 Baby Dot: A Dinosaur Story, Clarion Books, 1990
 Buddy Bear and the Bad Guys, Clarion Books, 1990
 That's Good! That's Bad!, Henry Holt, 1991
 The Christmas Snowman, Arcade Books, 1992
 The Biggest, Best Snowman, Scholastic, 1998
 From Here to There, Henry Holt, 1999
 100th Day Worries, Simon & Schuster, 2000
 Road Signs, Winslow Press, 2000
 Stop, Drop and Roll, Simon & Schuster, 2001
 Ah-choo!, Scholastic, 2002
 That's Good! That's Bad! In the Grand Canyon, Henry Holt, 2002
 Skeleton Hiccups, Margaret K. McElderry, 2002
 Big Friends, Walker and Company, 2004
 Please Say Please! Penguin's Guide to Manners, Scholastic, 2004
 Groundhog Stays Up Late, Walker/Bloomsbury, 2005
 The Bumpy Little Pumpkin, Scholastic, 2005
 Please Play Safe! Penguin's Guide to Playground Safety, Scholastic, 2006
 Kindness Is Cooler, Mrs. Ruler, Simon & Schuster, 2007
 That's Good! That's Bad! In Washington, D.C., Henry Holt, 2007
 Hooray for Reading Day!, Simon & Schuster, 2008
 Monster Mess, Margaret McElderry Books/Simon & Schuster, 2008
 We’re Going on a Lion Hunt, Marshall Cavendish, 2008
 The Little Dump Truck, Henry Holt, 2009
 That's Good! That's Bad! On Santa's Journey, Henry Holt, 2009
 Bullies Never Win, Simon & Schuster, 2009
 Princess Bess Gets Dressed, Simon & Schuster, 2009
 I Repeat, Don't Cheat!, Simon & Schuster, 2010
 Guinea Pigs Add Up, Walker and Company, 2010
 Tick Tock Clock, HarperCollins, 2012
 Skeleton for Dinner, Albert Whiteman, 2013
 The Little School Bus, Henry Holt, 2014
 The Little Dump Truck, Henry Holt, 2014

Novels
 The Trouble with Soap, E.P. Dutton, 1982
 Weird Wolf, Henry Holt, 1989
 Invisible in the Third Grade, Henry Holt, 1995
 The Battlefield Ghost, Scholastic, 1999

Nonfiction
 Jewish Holidays, Henry Holt, 1978
 The All-Around Pumpkin Book, Henry Holt, 1980
 The All-Around Christmas Book, Henry Holt, 1982

References

External links
 
 Publisher's Author Page*

Year of birth missing (living people)
Living people
American children's writers
People from Lawrence Township, Mercer County, New Jersey
People from Princeton, New Jersey